Adenta is one of the constituencies represented in the Parliament of Ghana. It elects one Member of Parliament (MP) by the first past the post system of election. Adenta is located in the Adentan Municipal District  of the Greater Accra Region of Ghana.

Boundaries
The seat is located within the Adentan Municipal Assembly of the Greater Accra Region of Ghana. It was formed prior to the 2004 December presidential and parliamentary elections by the division of the old Ashaiman constituency into the new Adenta and Ashaiman constituencies.

Members of Parliament

Elections

See also
List of Ghana Parliament constituencies

References 

Parliamentary constituencies in the Greater Accra Region